The First Stage of the 2012 Copa Santander Libertadores de América ran from January 24 to February 2, 2012 (first legs: January 24–26; second legs: January 31–February 2).

Format
The twelve teams were drawn into six ties on November 25, 2011 in Asunción.

Teams played in two-legged ties on a home-away basis. Each team earned 3 points for a win, 1 point for a draw, and 0 points for a loss. The following criteria were used for breaking ties on points:
Goal difference
Away goals
Penalty shootout (no extra time is played)
The six winners advanced to the second stage to join the 26 automatic qualifiers.

Matches
Team 1 played the second leg at home.

Match G1

Arsenal won on points 4–1.

Match G2

Tied on points 3–3, Flamengo won on goal difference.

Match G3

Peñarol won on points 4–1.

Match G4

Tied on points 3–3, Libertad won on goal difference.

Match G5

Internacional won on points 4–1.

Match G6

Unión Española won on points 4–1.

References

External links
Official webpage  

First Stage
January 2012 sports events in South America
February 2012 sports events in South America